WBDX (102.7 FM) is a radio station broadcasting a Contemporary Christian format and operating under the brand of J103. Licensed to Trenton, Georgia, United States, the station serves the Chattanooga, Tennessee area.  The station is owned by Partners For Christian Media, Inc and is the Tennessee Valley's only local Contemporary Christian music station. WJLJ (103.1 FM), licensed to Etowah, Tennessee, airs the same programming.

History of WBDX
The station went on the air as WBDX on October 31, 1989, as a Top 40/CHR station known as "The New B103, The Outrageous FM!" owned by local car dealer Herb Adcox. The station went under competition against the then legendary and Chattanooga's 1st ever Top 40/CHR FM powerhouse superstation WSKZ. The studio was located in a glass box in the middle of Eastgate Mall. Throughout its early years, the station was also known as "Magic 103 FM, The All-New WBDX" when it aired an Adult Contemporary format in the early 1990s. In January 1994 the station became "The New Talk 102.7" and took on a locally driven talk radio format, featuring local personalities, and the majorly popular afternoon drivetime show "Sport Talk". They kept this format until mid-1994 when Talk 102.7 moved to 102.3. In mid-1994, WBDX flipped to a classic rock known as "The New Fox 103", a format which had previously aired on 102.3. In early 1995 Partners For Christian Media bought WBDX. On March 4, 1995, WBDX started playing Contemporary Christian Music first under the name "102.7 The Light", but eventually they changed the name to "J103". The original J103 studio was located in a small 10x10 room within Eastgate. In 1998, J103 moved into what was actually the former home of the now-defunct WJRX (RX 107) (a former Contemporary Christian Music outlet in the Chattanooga area), with studios and offices in East Ridge. In October 2015, the station moved out near Hamilton Place Mall to a building on Hickory Valley Rd.; this move enabled J103 to begin broadcasting with state-of-the-art digital equipment. On February 4, 1998, the station changed its call sign to WJLL, and on February 5, 1998, it changed back to WBDX. The station was originally affiliated with Salem Communications to provide a large part of their on-air broadcasting. This included music programming from 7 p.m. – 6 a.m. and news. In 2005, the station dropped all Salem Communications programming and went fully local.

History of WJLJ
The station went on the air as WVKS on December 29, 1986. On August 4, 1989 the station changed its call sign to WDRZ, and its format to Contemporary Christian Music. The station was known as "SuperPower 103 FM". Then in the 1990's the station was owned by a man named Dr. Grey. In mid 1994 he fired the then husband and wife station managers and owners Bobby and Debbie Lubell who now operate J103, and installed a new staff and format. The station did not do well with its new country music format and soon flipped to modern rock. This format was also short lived, and in 1997 the station started simulcasting "97 Kicks FM" out of Chattanooga. On January 20, 1998, the callsign was changed to WLLJ, and then to the current WJLJ on August 13, 2015. WJLJ operates with an effective radiated power of 50,000 watts, enabling the station's signal to reach into the Knoxville market and the upper East Tennessee and Western North Carolina areas.

In 1997, "97/103 Kicks FM" was a Top 40/CHR station and it was simulcasting on 97.3 FM and 103.1 FM. The station was co-purchased by Partners For Christian Media, with the help of Friendship Broadcasting in late 1997 and began simulcasting WBDX in February 1998.

References

External links

Radio stations established in 1998
BDX